Dap or the dap is a friendly gesture of greeting, agreement, or solidarity between two people that has become popular in Western cultures, particularly since the 1970s, originating from African American communities. Giving dap or dapping typically involves handshaking (often, by hooking thumbs), pound hugging, fist pounding, or chest or fist bumping. The practice and term originated among black soldiers during the Vietnam War, as part of the Black Power movement. 90% of those imprisoned in the Long Binh Jail during the war were African Americans; it was in the jail that the handshake was created under pan-African nationalist influences.

Giving dap can refer to presenting many kinds of positive nonverbal communication between two people, ranging from a brief moment of simple bodily contact to a complicated routine of hand slaps, shakes, snaps, etc. known only by the two participants. Elaborate examples of dap are observed as a pregame ritual performed by many teams in the National Basketball Association. These choreographed actions serve as a means of psychological preparation and team solidarity.

Etymology
The etymology of dap is uncertain, and there are various theories. Most simply, it may be imitative (compare tap, dap), and is sometimes explained as an acronym for dignity and pride, possibly a backronym.

References

External links 

 Video of dap greetings archived at Ghostarchive.org on 27 April 2022

Dap
Dap
Hand gestures